Nuxia congesta, commonly known as brittle-wood, is a species of tree in the Stilbaceae family, with an extensive range in the Afrotropics. The species is named congesta for its dense inflorescences.

Range
The species is native to Eswatini, South Africa, Zimbabwe, Mozambique and Zimbabwe, northwards to tropical Africa, Ethiopia and southern Arabia. It is also found on the islands in the Gulf of Guinea.

Habitat
It is a component of woodland, bushveld or grassland, and occurs along forest verges, but has a predisposition for rocky terrain and cliff ledges.

Similar species
Nuxia glomerulata has a restricted range between Pretoria and Zeerust, South Africa, and differs by its more elliptic, leathery and glabrous leaves. Nuxia floribunda carries the leaves on long and slender petioles, and has larger and less dense inflorescences.

References

Stilbaceae
Trees of South Africa
Flora of Zimbabwe
Flora of Mozambique
Afromontane flora